"Please Don't Touch" is the debut single by English rock and roll group Johnny Kidd & the Pirates, released in 1959 reaching number 25 on the UK Singles Chart.

Personnel
Johnny Kidd – vocals
Mike West, Tom Brown – backing vocals
Alan Caddy – lead guitar
Tony Doherty – rhythm guitar
Johnny Gordon – bass
Ken McKay – drums (McKay was replaced during the session by Don Toye)

Cover versions
In 1980, Lemmy chose to record the song as the A-side of the Headgirl (Motörhead and Girlschool collaboration) St. Valentine's Day Massacre
In 1989, The Meteors on their recording,  Attack of the Chainsaw Mutants.
In 1992, the Stray Cats recorded a rockabilly version of the song for their album Choo Choo Hot Fish.
In 2003 the song was covered by Throw Rag on their Desert Shores album.

References

1959 debut singles
1959 songs
Songs written by Johnny Kidd (singer)
Motörhead songs